Highway 80 (AR 80, Ark. 80, and Hwy. 80) is an east–west state highway in the Ouachita Mountains. The route of  begins at AR 28 at Hon and runs east to AR 27 in Danville. The route is maintained by the Arkansas Department of Transportation (ArDOT).

Route description
The highway begins at AR 28 in western Scott County within the Ouachita Mountains. AR 28 runs southeast to Waldron, where it has a junction with US Highway 71 (US 71) on the city's west side. After this intersection, AR 80 continues due east as a section line road and major east–west route in the city. An intersection with US Highway 71 Business (US 71B) just south of downtown Waldron gives access to the primary commercial areas of Waldron. Continuing east, the highway serves as the western terminus for AR 248 just south of the Poteau River near the eastern city limits of Waldron. Just east of this junction, AR 80 passes the Poteau Work Center owned and operated by the United States Forest Service. East of Waldron, AR 80 enters the Ouachita National Forest, a dense pine and cypress forest. The route winds through the forest, serving as the eastern terminus of AR 250 before entering Yell County.

AR 80 continues through the National Forest to Waltreak, where it passes the Mitchell House listed on the National Register of Historic Places. It continues east through Chalybeate Springs before leaving the Forest near Macedonia. It curves northeast and runs along Dutch Creek as the highway enters Danville. AR 80 intersects AR 27 in southern Danville, where it terminates.

History
An earlier AR 80 was designated in the 1926 Arkansas state highway numbering from AR 45 at Prairie Grove to the Oklahoma border. This was deleted in 1931, as it was replaced by US 62. The current route was designated in 1945.

Major intersections

Former route

The route began at the Oklahoma state line and ran east to AR 45 east of Lincoln.

Major intersections

See also

References

External links

080
Transportation in Scott County, Arkansas
Transportation in Yell County, Arkansas